Kostadin Blagoev (born 16 February 1927) was a Bulgarian footballer. He played in five matches for the Bulgaria national football team from 1948 to 1957. He was also part of Bulgaria's squad for the 1952 Summer Olympics, but he did not play in any matches.

References

External links
 
 

1927 births
Possibly living people
Bulgarian footballers
Bulgaria international footballers
Place of birth missing (living people)
Association football midfielders
FC Lokomotiv 1929 Sofia players